This is a list of awards and nominations received by the American composer John Williams.

John Williams has been nominated for 53 Academy Awards, winning 5; 6 Emmy Awards, winning 3; 27 Golden Globe Awards, winning 4; 73 Grammy Awards, winning 25; 16 British Academy Film Awards, winning 7; 22 Saturn Awards, winning 8. With 53 Oscar nominations, Williams currently holds the record for the most Oscar nominations for a living person, and is the second most nominated person in Academy Awards history behind Walt Disney with 59, as well as the only person in the history of the Academy Awards to have received nominations in seven consecutive decades. Forty-seven of Williams's Oscar nominations are for Best Original Score and five are for Best Original Song. He won four Oscars for Best Original Score and one for Best Scoring: Adaptation and Original Song Score (Fiddler on the Roof).

In 1980 Williams received an Honorary Doctorate of Music from Berklee College of Music.

Since 1988, Williams has been honored with 15 Sammy Film Music Awards, the longest-running awards for film music recordings.

In 1998, Williams was inducted into the Songwriters Hall of Fame.

Williams was honored with the annual Richard Kirk award at the 1999 BMI Film and TV Awards, recognizing his contribution to film and television music. In 2004 he received a Kennedy Center Honor. He won a Classic Brit Award in 2005 for his soundtrack work of the previous year.

Williams has won the Grammy Awards for Best Instrumental Composition and Best Score Soundtrack for Visual Media several times for his scores for Star Wars, Close Encounters of the Third Kind, Superman, The Empire Strikes Back, E.T. the Extraterrestrial, Angela's Ashes, Munich, Indiana Jones and the Kingdom of the Crystal Skull, and The Book Thief, and one for his overture "Galaxy's Edge". The competition includes composers of instrumental music of any genre.

Williams received an Honorary Doctor of Music degree from Boston College in 1993, from Harvard University in 2017  and from the University of Pennsylvania in 2021.

In 2003 the International Olympic Committee accorded Williams its highest individual honor, the Olympic Order.

In 2004, in recognition of his compositions, Williams was inducted into the American Classical Music Hall of Fame. Earlier, in the year 2000, Williams had been inducted, alongside the singer and songwriter Garth Brooks, as one of the two inaugural inductees into the Hollywood Bowl Hall of Fame.

In 2009 Williams received the National Medal of Arts at the White House in Washington, D.C., for his achievements in symphonic music for films, and "as a pre-eminent composer and conductor [whose] scores have defined and inspired modern movie-going for decades."

Williams was made an honorary brother of Kappa Kappa Psi at Boston University in the late 1980s.

In 2012 Williams received the Brit Award for Outstanding Contribution to Music in the Classic category as well as the Brit Award for the Composer of the Year.

In 2013 Williams was presented with the Ken Burns Lifetime Achievement Award.

In 2018 the performing rights organization Broadcast Music, Inc. established The John Williams Award, of which Williams became the first recipient.

In 2020 Williams received the Gold Medal of the Royal Philharmonic Society as well as the Princess of Asturias Award for the Arts (jointly with Ennio Morricone).
In the same year the Vienna Philharmonic Orchestra honored Williams with a commission to compose a new procedural for their annual Philharmonikerball, to complement or replace their hitherto used 1924 fanfare composed by Richard Strauss.

In 2022 British media company Global awarded Williams with one of their 2022 Global Awards, in the Best Classical Artist category.

Major associations

Academy Awards

British Academy Film Awards

Golden Globe Awards

Grammy Awards

Primetime Emmy Awards

Other

Saturn Awards

AFI
In 2005 the American Film Institute selected Williams's score to 1977's Star Wars as the greatest American film score of all time. His scores for Jaws and E.T. also appeared on the list, at   6 and   14, respectively. He is the only composer to have three scores on the list. Williams received the AFI Life Achievement Award in June 2016, becoming the first composer to receive the award.

References 

Williams, John